The Men's 100 metres at the 2011 Summer Universiade took place on 16–17 August. 
The gold medal was won by Jacques Harvey of Jamaica in a time of 10.14 seconds and was followed home by Rytis Sakalauskas of Lithuania in silver (same time) and Su Bingtian of China in bronze

Medalists

Results

Heats
The first round was held on 16 August. Qualification: First 3 in each heat (Q) and the next 5 fastest (q) qualified for the quarterfinals.

Wind:Heat 1: -0.1 m/s, Heat 2: +0.4 m/s, Heat 3: +0.5 m/s, Heat 4: -0.4 m/s, Heat 5: -0.4 m/s, Heat 6: -0.4 m/s, Heat 7: -0.4 m/s, Heat 8: -0.4 m/s, Heat 9: -0.4 m/s

Quarterfinals
The second round of the 100 metre competition was also held on 16 August. Qualification: First 3 in each heat (Q) and the next 4 fastest (q) qualified for the semifinals.

Wind:Heat 1: -0.1 m/s, Heat 2: +0.1 m/s, Heat 3: +0.5 m/s, Heat 4: +0.4 m/s

Semi-finals

Qualification: First 4 of each semifinal qualified directly (Q) for the final.

Wind:Heat 1: 0.0 m/s, Heat 2: -0.8 m/s

Final

The final took place on the 17 August.

Wind: -0.2 m/s

References
Heats results
Quarterfinals results
Semifinals results
Final results

100
2011